Phyliadon was a fortress and town of Phthiotis in ancient Thessaly. A border dispute with Peuma was settled by neutral arbitration.

Its site is located near the modern Morges (or Mories).

References

Populated places in ancient Thessaly
Former populated places in Greece
Achaea Phthiotis